Maximiliano Daniel Algañaraz (born 14 July 1996) is an Argentine professional footballer who plays as a defender or midfielder for Atenas.

Career
Algañaraz began his footballing career with Trinidad, making five first-team appearances in the 2014 Torneo Federal B. March 2015 saw Algañaraz join San Martín of the Primera División. Before making his senior debut, he was an unused substitute for a league match with Newell's Old Boys on 18 December 2016. His competitive bow for them arrived six months later during a Copa Argentina home loss to Atlanta. Algañaraz didn't play in a league match for San Martín, departing at the end of 2018. A move to Juventud Alianza of Torneo Regional Federal Amateur was completed in early 2019. Six appearances followed.

In July 2019, Torneo Federal A club Defensores de Belgrano signed Algañaraz. His debut arrived on 31 August against Sarmiento, which preceded a further three matches for the club. January 2020 saw Algañaraz, following a trial, join fourth tier outfit Atenas.

Career statistics
.

References

External links

1996 births
Living people
Sportspeople from San Juan Province, Argentina
Argentine footballers
Association football defenders
Association football midfielders
Torneo Federal A players
Trinidad de San Juan players
San Martín de San Juan footballers
Juventud Alianza players
Defensores de Belgrano de Villa Ramallo players
Sportivo y Biblioteca Atenas de Río Cuarto players